Sohilwara is a village in the Begusarai District of the Indian state of Bihar. It lies some 46 kilometres from Begusarai, in Mansurchak Tehsil.

References

Villages in Begusarai district